The Shark Bay Marine Park is protected marine park located within the UNESCO World Heritagelisted Shark Bay, in the Gascoyne region of Western Australia.

The marine park is known for its large marine animals, such as the famous Monkey Mia dolphins, turtles, dugongs and sharks. The park and its vast seagrass meadows, with a total of twelve species of seagrass in the park that form an important part of the Shark Bay World Heritage Area.

Major reference points of its boundaries include Steep Point at the south side of Dirk Hartog Island and Cape Inscription at the north side.

Fishing
Fishing in the marine park are governed by the Gascoyne Fishing Rules that specify the waters and species of the Shark Bay area, also known as the Shark Bay Inner Gulfs:

 Eastern Gulf Zone: the region located east of the Peron Peninsula and north from Cape Peron North ( to a line at 25°16.6'S) and east to the coast of the mainland.  Fishing is not permitted in the southern portion of this zone, the Hamelin Pool Marine Nature Reserve.
 Denham Sound: the region also known as the Western Gulf Zone, south to line at Goulet Bluff (25°13’S) which separates the Freycinet Estuary.

See also

 Protected areas of Western Australia
 Australian marine parks

References

Further reading

Shark Bay
Marine parks of Western Australia
1989 establishments in Australia
Protected areas established in 1989